USS Daniel Inouye (DDG-118) is an  in the United States Navy. She is named to honor former United States Senator Daniel Inouye of Hawaii. Inouye was awarded the Medal of Honor for his actions in Tuscany, Italy, during World War II. She is part of Destroyer Squadron 31 of Naval Surface Group Middle Pacific.

Construction and commissioning 
Daniel Inouye is the third of eight planned Flight IIA "technology insertion" ships, which contains elements of the Flight III ships projected to begin with DDG-125.

Daniel Inouyes keel was laid on 14 May 2018 and christened by Inouye's widow, Irene Hirano Inouye, on 22 June 2019. General Dynamics Bath Iron Works delivered the ship to the U.S. Navy on 8 March 2021. She was commissioned on 8 December 2021 in a ceremony at her homeport, Joint Base Pearl Harbor–Hickam. Maggie Inouye, with presence of Jessica Inouye and Jennifer Sabas, giving the order to "man our ship and bring her to life" in the place of Irene Hirano Inouye, who died in 2020.

References

External links

 Official ship's site
 

 

Arleigh Burke-class destroyers
2019 ships